Peskovci is a small village immediately east of Gornji Petrovci in the Prekmurje region of Slovenia.

References

External links

Peskovci on Geopedia

Populated places in the Municipality of Gornji Petrovci